In abstract algebra, the Virasoro group or Bott–Virasoro group (often denoted by Vir) is an infinite-dimensional Lie group defined as the universal central extension of the group of diffeomorphisms of the circle. The corresponding Lie algebra is the Virasoro algebra, which has a key role in conformal field theory (CFT) and string theory.

The group is named after Miguel Ángel Virasoro and Raoul Bott.

Background
The set of all such maps spans a group, with multiplication given by the composition of diffeomorphisms.

Definition
The extension is defined by a specific two-cocycle, which is a real-valued function  of pairs of diffeomorphisms. Specifically, the extension is defined by the Bott–Thurston cocycle:

This operation is an associative group operation. This extension is the only central extension of the universal cover of the group of circle diffeomorphisms, up to trivial extensions. The Virasoro group can also be defined without the use explicit coordinates or an explicit choice of cocycle to represent the central extension, via a description the universal cover of the group.

Virasoro algebra 

The Lie algebra of the Virasoro group is the Virasoro algebra. The vector field, in particular, can be seen as an infinitesimal diffeomorphism . The Lie bracket of pairs  then follows from the multiplication defined above, and can be shown to satisfy

where the bracket of vector fields on the right-hand side is the usual one: . Upon defining the complex generators

the Lie bracket takes the standard textbook form of the Virasoro algebra:

The generator  commutes with the whole algebra. Since its presence is due to a central extension, it is subject to a superselection rule which guarantees that, in any physical system having Virasoro symmetry, the operator representing  is a multiple of the identity. The coefficient in front of the identity is then known as a central charge.

Properties
Since each diffeomorphism  must be specified by infinitely many parameters (for instance the Fourier modes of the periodic function ), the Virasoro group is infinite-dimensional.

Coadjoint representation
The Lie bracket of the Virasoro algebra can be viewed as a differential of the adjoint representation of the Virasoro group. Its dual, the coadjoint representation of the Virasoro group, provides the transformation law of a CFT stress tensor under conformal transformations. From this perspective, the Schwarzian derivative in this transformation law emerges as a consequence of the Bott–Thurston cocycle; in fact, the Schwarzian is the so-called Souriau cocycle (referring to Jean-Marie Souriau) associated with the Bott–Thurston cocycle.

References

Lie groups
Linear algebraic groups